The Raven: Legacy of a Master Thief is an episodic point-and-click adventure video game developed by King Art Games.

Gameplay
The gameplay incorporates elements of stealth and detective work. It includes some cross-genre gameplay standards such as lockpicking doors and gathering key items. It also includes a point system, which serves as a ranking system and can be used to unlock new areas of the map. One of its main gameplay elements is puzzle solving.

Synopsis
Taking place in 1964, the plot revolves around a set of rubies known as the Eyes of the Sphinx one of which was stolen by an unknown person wearing a mask, and the other must be guarded by the player's character as it is transported to an exhibition in Cairo Egypt. Contrary to common detective genre conventions, you play as middle-aged Swiss police constable Anton Jakob Zellner, a clever but inexperienced and unproven officer, who manages impress the well-respected detective known as Nicolas Legrand enough to aid in his investigation. Though he has a fond interest in detective novels, Zellner has little experience in detective work.

Development
The game was released for Microsoft Windows via Steam as of July 23, 2013. On January 10, 2018, a trailer for The Raven Remastered was released by THQ Nordic. The game was released on March 13, 2018 for Microsoft Windows, macOS, PlayStation 4 and Xbox One, and was enhanced for Xbox One X. A Nintendo Switch version was released in 2019.

Chapters
"Chapter 1: The Eye of the Sphinx"
"Chapter 2: Ancestry of Lies"
"Chapter 3: A Murder of Ravens"

Reception

The game received mixed or average reviews from critics on Metacritic with a score of 74.
IGN made a favorable comparison between Legacy of a Master Thief and classic literary works such as And Then There Were None.
Joystiq praised the game for its writing and voice acting, praising in particular the nuances in main character Zellner's voice, but criticized it for being formulaic with its clunky execution.
Game Informer'''s review was mixed, expressing excitement for the next installment in the series and finding the game's mystery intriguing enough to cover for "antiquated design", but claimed a cliffhanger ending required one to play all three episodes to feel fulfilled. GameSpot'' called the game boring and criticized it for glitchy movement.

Notes

References

External links

2013 video games
Episodic video games
Detective video games
King Art Games games
Neo-noir video games
Point-and-click adventure games
Stealth video games
Video games set in the 1960s
Video games set in Africa
Video games set in Egypt
Video games set in Switzerland
Video games set in Venice
Xbox 360 games
PlayStation 3 games
PlayStation 4 games
Nintendo Switch games
MacOS games
Windows games
Xbox One games
Linux games
Single-player video games
THQ Nordic games
Video games about police officers
Video games developed in Germany
Fiction set in 1964
The Adventure Company games